Demir Kadrić (born 9 March 1994) is a Serbian football defender.

References

External links
 
 Demir Kadrić stats at utakmica.rs
 Demir Kadrić stats at footballdatabase.eu

1994 births
Living people
Bosniaks of Serbia
Sportspeople from Novi Pazar
Association football defenders
Serbian footballers
FK Novi Pazar players
RFK Grafičar Beograd players
Serbian SuperLiga players